The Clemson Area African American Museum (CAAAM) is a museum located in Calhoun Bridge Center, Clemson, South Carolina, United States. The Museum focuses on historical achievements and culture of African Americans  by serving as a resource center for the Greater Clemson Area to engage the local and upstate South Carolina communities in intellectual discourse about the past.

CAAAM hosts independent and collaborative educational and informative presentations, workshops, innovative programs, and hands-on activities that serve the public, museum visitors and civic organizations.

History
The Clemson Area African American Museum was chartered by the City of Clemson, South Carolina in 2002 and first opened in 2007. The realization of the museum was brought one step closer to reality when the City of Clemson, fostered by the vision of Mayor Larry Abernathy, purchased and renovated the facility for community and cultural purposes.

The Clemson Area African American Museum is located in the Calhoun Bridge Center and the center was formerly an all-black school that was known as the Calhoun Elementary School. It was the last school built for African American students in this part of Pickens County.

Building
The Clemson Area African American Museum is located in the old Morrison Annex Building.

The site of the “Morrison Annex” building in the Goldenview community was  home to the second African American School “Calhoun Elementary” during segregation. It was preceded by a one-room school house that stood near the Goldenview Baptist Church. The current annex building was built by Pickens County School district in the 1940s to serve the needs of the growing number of African American families in the Calhoun area.

After desegregation both the name and the use of the Calhoun Elementary School building changed. In 1971, the building was converted to a kindergarten and first grade facility, with grades two through five, attending Margaret Morrison Elementary School and named Morrison Annex.

After the opening of the Clemson Elementary School at its new location, the City of Clemson acquired the Morrison Annex property in August 2003 for $100,000 from the Pickens County school district.

The building on Butler Street was refurbished at a cost of about $1.3 million, the overhaul finished in 2006.

On April 16, 2007, the City of Clemson officially the name change for the Morrison Annex to the Calhoun Bridge Center.

The Calhoun Bridge Center, not only houses the Clemson Area African American Museum, it also houses the Clemson Child Development Center and the Arts Center of Clemson.

Collection
CAAAM exists to research, collect, preserve and interpret for public enrichment, the history, art and culture of African Americans. The museum conserves  objects of art, historical artifacts and memorabilia other reference materials available for limited public use.

See also

List of museums focused on African Americans
List of museums in South Carolina                                                  
Southern Arts Federation
National Endowment for the Arts

Further reading
 Ashton, Susanna, Thomas, Rhonda. The South Carolina Roots of African American Thought. A Reader. University of South Carolina Press (2014).
 Jackson, Vince. The Littlejohn's Grill Story : Blues, Jazz and Rock 'n' Roll in Clemson, SC. Clemson, SC : Sugarcane Pub., (2011, 2008).
 Suggs, Dr. H. Lewis. Harvey Gantt and the Desegregation of Clemson University, 1960–1963.
 Integration with Dignity: A Celebration of Harvey Gantt’s Admission to Clemson. Edited by Skip Eisiminger. Clemson University Digital Press (2003)

References

External links

African-American museums in South Carolina
African-American arts organizations
Museums in Pickens County, South Carolina
Museums established in 2002
2002 establishments in South Carolina
Organizations established in 2002
Clemson, South Carolina